Daisy Hage (born 2 March 1993) is a Dutch handball player who plays for HV Quintus.

References

1993 births
Living people
Dutch female handball players
Sportspeople from The Hague
21st-century Dutch women